Events from the year 1864 in France.

Incumbents
 Monarch – Napoleon III

Events
10 April - Second French intervention in Mexico: Treaty of Miramar.
4 May - Société Générale bank established in Paris.
14 May - The Orgueil meteorite falls to earth.
19 June - American Civil War: Battle of Cherbourg - Confederate States Navy CSS Alabama is sunk in a single-ship action with USS Kearsarge in la Manche off the coast of Cherbourg Harbour.
5–6 September - Bombardment of Shimonoseki: An international naval fleet including three French ships defeats Japanese daimyō Mōri Takachika in the Shimonoseki Straits of Japan.

Arts and literature
April - Charles Baudelaire leaves Paris for Belgium in the hope of resolving his financial difficulties.
26 May - Alexandre Dumas, fils marries Nadejda Naryschkine. His father, Alexandre Dumas, père, returns to Paris from Italy.
17 December - Jacques Offenbach's opéra bouffe La Belle Hélène receives its first performance at the Théâtre des Variétés in Paris.
Jules Verne's Journey to the Center of the Earth (Voyage au centre de la Terre) is published.

Births
24 January - Marguerite Durand, actress, journalist and suffragette (died 1936).
1 March - Étienne Destot, radiologist and anatomist (died 1918).
16 March - Lucien Cayeux, sedimentary petrographer (died 1944).
10 May - Léon Gaumont, inventor, engineer, film pioneer and industrialist (died 1946).
11 November - Maurice Leblanc, novelist and short story writer (died 1941).
16 November - Stéphane Javelle, astronomer (died 1917)
24 November - Henri de Toulouse-Lautrec, painter (died 1901).
8 December - Camille Claudel, sculptor and graphic artist (died 1943).
28 December - Henri de Régnier, poet (died 1936).

Deaths
28 January - Benoît Paul Émile Clapeyron, engineer and physicist (born 1799).
1 February - Princess Louise Marie Thérèse of France, Petite-Fille de France (born 1819).
2 March - Jean Alaux, painter (born 1786).
4 March - John James Appleton, diplomat (born 1789)
21 March - Jean-Hippolyte Flandrin, painter (born 1809).
27 March - Jean-Jacques Ampère, philologist (born 1800).
29 April - Charles Julien Brianchon, mathematician and chemist (born 1783).
22 May - Aimable Pélissier, Marshal of France (born 1794).
31 July - Louis Christophe François Hachette, publisher (born 1800).
7 August - Olympe-Philippe Gerbet, Roman Catholic Bishop and writer (born 1798).
1 September - Barthélemy Prosper Enfantin, social reformer (born 1796).
Full date unknown - Joseph Déjacque, anarcho-communist poet and writer (born 1821).

References

1860s in France